Kerben (older name Karavan) is a town in Jalal-Abad Region of Kyrgyzstan. Its population was 18,695 in 2021. It is the administrative centre of Aksy District.

Despite the fact that the town officially was founded in the early 1920s, medieval Persian historiographers noted in their works a caravanserai, or fortified “hotel” for merchants and travelers, in a place very close to today's Kerben. Archaeological excavations carried out by A. Bernshtam corroborated that records.

Kerben gained notoriety in 2002 when police fired into a crowd of unarmed demonstrators, killing six.  The demonstrations were triggered by a political dispute between a local member of the national parliament, Azimbek Beknazarov, and Kyrgyz President Askar Akayev over an agreement with China that ceded some territory in the high Tien Shan range to China. Local officials and police officers suspected of being involved in the shootings were later acquitted or pardoned.

Beknazarov remained an implacable political enemy of Akayev. In the wake of the March 2005 Tulip Revolution which sent Akayev into exile in Russia, he was appointed Prosecutor General of the Kyrgyz Republic and waged a determined campaign against Akayev and his family, seeking the return of much of the fortune amassed by the former president's family and a repeal of Akayev's immunity for life. He resigned his position in September 2005 under a cloud of suspicion concerning alleged secret deals of money for premature closure of investigations into other misdeeds.

Kerben is located in the nation's northwest, some 220 km from the regional centre Jalal-Abad and 60 km from the Tash-Kömür town railway.  Kerben borders in the southwest with the village of Nanai in Uzbekistan.

Kerben is located in the center of the Aksy region, at a height of 1,200 meters above sea level. The lay of the land is mainly flat. The climate is classified as continental. Kerben Airport has weekly flights to Bishkek, Osh and Jalal-Abad.

Population

References

Populated places in Jalal-Abad Region